Alexandre Gonsse de Rougeville (1761–1814) was a French counter-revolutionary.

1761 births
1814 deaths
French counter-revolutionaries
Order of Saint Louis recipients
People of the Ancien Régime